M10 is a liquid-fuel upper-stage rocket engine  by Avio on behalf of European Space Agency for use on Vega E. The engine, initially known as LM10-MIRA, was a derivation of the existing Russian RD-0146 engine and result of a past collaboration between Avio and Chemical Automatics Design Bureau (KBKhA) ended in 2014 after the escalation of the Russo-Ukrainian conflict and consequent economic sanctions. On May 6, 2022 engine testing campaign started at Salto di Quirra, Sardinia, with consequent maiden flight on a Vega-E launcher expected by 2026 from Guiana Space Centre.

Overview 
The M10 engine is the first operational European methane rocket engine, conceived for use on upper stages of future Vega-E and Vega-E Light launchers, in which will replace both the solid-fueled Zefiro 3rd stage and hydrazine-fueled AVUM 4th upper stage. An industrial team directed by Avio with companies of Austria, Belgium, France, Czech Republic, Romania and Switzerland will manufacture the engine.

Development 
A feasibility study on improving Vega started in 2004, when the rocket was still in development, with the aim of increase performance, reduce costs and move away from toxic hydrazine fuels. The study proposed a new three-stage version of the rocket named Lyra with a liquid oxygen-methane upper stage.
In 2007 Avio and KBKhA started the collaboration for the development of such an engine under an agreement signed between Italian and Russian governments in Moscow on November 28, 2000. The first phase of the collaboration, ended in 2008, aimed at designing a concept for a 10t thrust LOx-LNG engine. The second phase of the collaboration focused instead on designing, manufacturing and testing a 7.5t thrust LM10-MIRA demonstrator engine. The engine was successfully tested in June 2014 in Voronezh, Russia.

After the end of the collaboration with KHBhA, Avio continued the development of M10 under the Vega-Evolution program returning to the original target thrust of 10t. Objectives were finalizing development of main subsystems such as turbopumps, valves, igniter, thrust vectoring and a new ALM 3D printed Thrust Chamber Assembly (TCA). A subscale model of the TCA was tested successfully on 13 November 2018 in Colleferro, Italy. 

In February 2020 a full scale engine prototype with a 3D printed TCA was successfully tested at NASA Marshall Space Flight Center, firing 19 times for a total of 450 seconds.

On May 6 2022, the engine test and qualification campaign started in Avio's new Space Propulsion Test Facility (SPTF) at the Salto di Quirra with a single firing of 20 seconds. The first series of testing concluded successfully in July 2022 with a total ignition time of more than 800 seconds.

See also

 Attitude Vernier Upper Module (AVUM)
 Prometheus (rocket engine)
 Liquid rocket
 Vega (rocket)
 RD-0146

Comparable engines
 Aeon 1
 TQ-11

References

European Space Agency
Rocket propulsion
Rocket engines using methane propellant
Rocket engines using the expander cycle